During the 2000–01 English football season, Preston North End F.C. competed in the Football League First Division, the second tier of English football.

Season summary
After being promoted to the First Division, Preston North End occupied the play-offs spots for most of the season and eventually finished fourth to qualify for the play-offs for promotion to the Premiership. After beating Birmingham City 4–2 on penalties after a 2–2 draw on aggregate over two legs North End faced Lancashire rivals Bolton Wanderers at the Millennium Stadium. Bolton took a 17th-minute lead through Gareth Farrelly, and, despite Preston fighting for an equaliser, goals from Michael Ricketts and Ricardo Gardner in the 89th and 90th minutes ended Preston's hopes of a second successive promotion and a return to the top flight after an absence of over 50 years.

First-team squad

Left club during season

Preston North End F.C. seasons
Preston North End